The World of Normal Boys, published in 2001, is the debut novel of K.M. Soehnlein (Karl Soehnlein). The coming-of-age story centers on 13-year-old Robin MacKenzie, who discovers that he is unlike most other adolescent males. The book became a San Francisco Chronicle bestseller and won the Lambda Literary Award.

Plot
The book is written in the present tense. It's 1978, New Jersey: Saturday Night Fever and Grease are big. 13-year-old Robin MacKenzie is caught in a triangular relationship with next-door neighbor Todd Spicer and classmate Scott Schatz.

Robin develops a fascination for 17-year-old neighbor Todd who, despite often teasing him, initiates a sexual relationship with the younger boy, whom Todd invites to a party after which they go swimming on a golf course. Robin further forms a close bond with fellow freshman Scott Schatz, whose father is physically abusive. Robin learns that, two years earlier, Todd and Scott were involved in a sexual relationship. Robin is troubled by this, but his relationship with Scott is ultimately unaffected.

During the novel, Robin's younger brother Jackson dies some time after falling from a slide and breaking his neck, an incident Robin blames himself for although it isn't anyone's fault. As a result, Robin's family begins to break down: his father becomes violent towards Robin, and Robin's longstanding bond with his mother begins to be affected. His younger sister Ruby becomes religious and also closer to Robin.

Characters

Main
MacKenzie
 Robin MacKenzie – A 13-year-old boy, just entering high school, coming to terms with his sexuality and a terrifying accident involving his brother.
 Jackson MacKenzie – Robin's adventurous 11-year-old younger brother who falls from a slide, an incident that puts the family in turmoil
 Ruby MacKenzie – Robin's 12-year-old sister, after the accident, she becomes religious and closer to Robin as he protects her from their bullying cousin, Larry
 Dorothy McKenzie – Robin, Ruby, and Jackson's mom; she takes Robin on "City Days" where they spend a day in New York City
 Clark McKenzie – Robin, Ruby, and Jackson's dad; he tries to spend time with Robin, although Robin would rather do so with his mother, so Clark spends his time with Jackson; he has what is probably the hardest time with Jackson's accident
 Larry – Robin, Ruby, and Jackson's oafish cousin, who loves teasing Ruby and provoking Robin
 Corinne – Robin, Ruby, and Jackson's kindly aunt; Stan's wife, whom he regularly verbally abuses, and Larry's mom
 Stan – Robin, Ruby, and Jackson's loud and obnoxious uncle; Larry's dad; he inadvertently gets Dorothy drunk at a Super Bowl party

Spicer
 Todd Spicer – Robin's 17-year-old next-door neighbor and Victoria's older brother
 Victoria Spicer – Todd's cute younger sister, whom Robin shares a friendship. The two share a love of Grease, Saturday Night Fever, and Mork and Mindy
 Mr. Spicer – Todd and Victoria's dad; unseen character who, as Victoria once said, "beat the shit out of Todd" when Todd wanted to quit school
 Mrs. Spicer – Todd and Victoria's mom; also unseen, but known to be picky about cleanliness

Schatz
 Scott Schatz – One of Robin's classmates whom Robin becomes infatuated with
 Daniel Schatz – Scott's late brother, whose death he blames on himself
 Mr. Schatz – Scott's dad, abusive towards Scott
 Mrs. Schatz – Scott's mom, who is living in a mental institution

Supporting
 Mr. Cortez – The school guidance counselor
 Billy Danniman – One of Robin and Scott's classmates. Regularly bullies Robin. Has the nickname "Long Dong" Danniman
 Seth Carter – Another of Robin and Scott's classmates; a friend of Danniman
 Ethan – One of Todd's friends
 Tully – Another of Todd's friends
 Debbie Staley – A girl whom is rumored that Todd has impregnated

References

External links
 
 Karl M. Soehnlein official site

2001 American novels
American children's novels
American LGBT novels
Gay male teen fiction
Lambda Literary Award-winning works
American young adult novels
American bildungsromans
Fiction set in 1978
2001 children's books
2000s LGBT novels
LGBT-related young adult novels
LGBT-related children's novels
2001 debut novels
Kensington Books books
2001 LGBT-related literary works